Kishestan (also Romanized as Kīshestān and Kīshastān; also known as Geshestān, Ghashistān, Keshistan, and Qīshestān) is a village in Hend Khaleh Rural District, Tulem District, Sowme'eh Sara County, Gilan Province, Iran. At the 2006 census, its population was 536, in 148 families.

References 

Populated places in Sowme'eh Sara County